The Welsh football league system (or pyramid) is a series of football leagues with regular promotion and relegation between them.

While most Welsh clubs play in the Welsh pyramid and most clubs in that pyramid are Welsh, five Welsh clubs play in England, and four English clubs play in Wales.

Structure of Welsh football

Tier 1: Cymru Premier

At the top is the Cymru Premier, which is the only national league in Wales and is run by the Football Association of Wales.

Tier 2: Cymru North and Cymru South

Since 2019–20, the Football Association of Wales runs the second tier for the first time after a review of the Welsh league pyramid. Tier 2 is split into a north and central Wales league, Cymru North, and a corresponding league for south Wales, Cymru South. The champions of each of these leagues can be promoted to the Cymru Premier, subject to acceptable ground facilities, and if the champions cannot meet the criteria the runner-up team may be considered.

The Cymru North replaced the Cymru Alliance whilst the Cymru South incorporated most of the clubs of the then-highest division of the Welsh Football League.

Tier 3: Ardal Leagues
Since the 2020–21 season, the Football Association of Wales has run the third tier after a review of the Welsh league pyramid. Tier 3, called the Ardal Leagues is split into a Northern and Southern League, with each league divided into two regionally based divisions, giving North East, North West, South East and South West leagues, each consisting of a maximum of 16 clubs. In an attempt to avoid dividing the current Mid-Wales teams across all four leagues, the North-East league contains a large contingent of the Mid-Wales teams. The North-West league contains the sides near the North Wales coast. To be eligible to join the league, clubs need to meet the criteria for FAW tier 3 certification.

The Ardal Leagues structure replaces the former tier 3 leagues: Welsh Football League Division One, Mid Wales Football League Division One, Welsh Alliance League Division 1 and the Welsh National League Premier Division, leagues based in South Wales, Mid Wales, North West Wales and North East Wales respectively.

There are three relegated clubs from each of the tier 3 leagues at the end of each season.

Tier 4: Area leagues
Below this are six local tier 4 leagues, each run by one of the area associations of Welsh football:

Central Wales League (run by Central Wales Football Association)
North East Wales Football League Premier Division (run by North East Wales Football Association)
North Wales Coast East Football League Premier Division and North Wales Coast West Football League Premier Division (run by North Wales Coast Football Association)
Gwent County League Premier Division (run by Gwent County Football Association)
West Wales Premier League (run by the West Wales Football Association)
South Wales Alliance League Premier Division (run by South Wales Football Association) 

The winners of each league are eligible for promotion to the Ardal Leagues subject to meeting FAW tier 3 certification. In the event that winners do not meet the criteria, the runner-up is also eligible for promotion, again subject to meeting the same tier 3 certification requirements.

Lower tier leagues

North Wales
Below the North Wales Coast East and West there are Division One leagues at tier 5 and North East Wales Football League has a championship division, also at tier 5.

Central Wales
In this area there are four leagues at tier 5 - the Ceredigion League, the Montgomeryshire League, the Mid Wales South League as well as the Aberystwyth League. These offer promotion to the tier 4 Mid Wales League East and West divisions.

South Wales
Local leagues are affiliated to Gwent FA, South Wales FA, and West Wales FA respectively, with promotion up the pyramid possible.

In the Gwent Football Association Area, clubs from the Newport and District, East Gwent, Gwent Central and North Gwent leagues have a promotion pathway to Division Two of the Gwent County League (tier 6). Champions (or runners-up) of these leagues are eligible for promotion if they satisfy FAW criteria. 

The South Wales Alliance League offers a promotion pathway to leagues affiliated to the South Wales Football Association. Champions of local leagues in the towns and cities of South Wales play off to be promoted into the South Wales Alliance Division Two (tier 6), subject to meeting licensing requirements.

The West Wales FA area has had its own Premier League since its creation in 2020, having previously having been the only FA area to not have one. Promotion to this tier 4 league is possible from the champions of the Pembrokeshire, Carmarthenshire, Swansea Senior and Neath & District Leagues, subject to meeting FAW licensing requirements. The top divisions of each of these leagues are at tier 5.

Current system

From the 2022–23 season, the following structure will follow. For each division, its official name and number of clubs is given:

See also
Football in Wales
Welsh Cup
Welsh League Cup
FAW Premier Cup
List of football clubs in Wales
List of stadiums in Wales by capacity

External links
Welsh Football Magazine's page on the Welsh Pyramid 

Football leagues in Wales
Wales